Edward J. Montagne Jr. (May 20, 1912 – December 15, 2003) was a television series producer and film director who directed the films McHale's Navy (1964) starring Ernest Borgnine, its sequel McHale's Navy Joins the Air Force (1965) starring Joe Flynn and Tim Conway, The Reluctant Astronaut (1967) starring Don Knotts and They Went That-A-Way & That-A-Way (1978) starring Tim Conway and Chuck McCann. He was the son of screenwriter Edward J. Montagne, In 1978, Montagne was nominated for an Primetime Emmy for Outstanding Drama Series.

References

External links

1912 births
2003 deaths
American television producers
American film directors
American film producers
People from Brooklyn